Mundrabilla Land District is a land district (cadastral division) of Western Australia, located within the Eucla Land Division on the Nullarbor Plain. It spans roughly 31°00'S - 32°00'S in latitude and 127°30'E - 129°00'E in longitude.

Location and features
The district is located on the Nullarbor Plain on the Western Australia–South Australia border, and falls generally between the Great Australian Bight to the south and the Trans-Australian Railway to the north. The town of Eucla on the Eyre Highway and the railway town of Forrest are located within its boundaries.

History
The district was created on 4 March 1903. When the Trans-Australian Railway was being built in 1914, the district was adjusted such that the railway formed its northern boundary. It was hence defined in the Government Gazette:

References

	

Land districts of Western Australia
Goldfields-Esperance